Tumba is a Neolithic settlement located in the north-eastern part of Skopje, North Macedonia and it is the most significant Neolithic settlement in Skopje valley. It was discovered in 1961/2 in the course of the archaeological trial excavations related to the construction of the motorway.

The first archaeological excavations were conducted in 1978 by the Museum of Macedonia, under the leadership of Voislav Sanev. The stratigraphy of the settlement has a cultural layer that indicates life was continuously taking place in the period between year 6000 and 4300 BC.

The land was used mostly for agriculture, conserving the remains of a multifaceted settlement. The evidence of the multiple stages of the settlement is found within a three-foot layer which shows the three stages of life within the community and that the settlement was part of the Anzabegovo-Vršnik cultural group. One of the first structures found was a house, believed to be a sanctuary, demonstrating evidence for religion.

The most representative finding of site is the discovery of Pre-Indo-European sculptures of the Great Mother, suggesting the 
existence of the Cult of the Great Mother Goddess. These findings are remarkable evidence of the material and spiritual life and high artistic and aesthetic achievements of the Neolithic man from Macedonia.

External links
Official web page of the archaeological site Tumba Madzari
Официјална страница на археолошкиот локалитет Тумба Маџари
https://web.archive.org/web/20111205152411/http://makedonija.name/culture/tumba-madzari

References 

Archaeological sites in North Macedonia
Geography of Skopje
Former populated places in the Balkans
1960s archaeological discoveries